Tilslørte bondepiker ( veiled farm girls. Known in Swedish as änglamat; Danish: bondepige med slør; Norwegian: tilslørte bondepiker; Finnish: pappilan hätävara;) is a traditional Scandinavian dessert. The dessert is available in a number of different variations. It is typically served in transparent glass or bowls.

Example of a recipe: Applesauce (or other mashed fruits) are spread out at the bottom, followed by a layer of whipped cream, a layer of toasted bread- or rusk crumbs, followed by another layer of whipped cream and usually a thin layer of crumbs on top. Often in multiple layers. Possible decorations also include hazelnuts or flaked almonds.

See also
 List of desserts

References

Related reading
S. Schmidt-Nielsen, Mat-leksikon: en oppslagsbok for mat og drikkevarer. Trondheim 1947 (In Norwegian)

Desserts
Fruit dishes
Scandinavian culture